Schmeckfest (festival of tasting) is an annual four-day festival in Freeman, South Dakota, that celebrates the heritage and culture of Mennonites, an ethnic group of Plautdietsch-speaking Mennonites from the Russian Empire, who emigrated to North America starting in the 1870s. Established in 1959, Schmeckfest showcases the traditional foods, crafts and talents of the Freeman community with Mennonite food, demonstrations, displays, programs and a full-stage musical theater production. Schmeckfest has been held every spring since and has grown to accommodate more than 5,000 guests every year. The event is held at Freeman Academy, a grade 1 to 12 private school, and raises about $90,000 annually for the school.

A multi-course meal and a musical are the main fundraising events. The festival also includes displays, programs, demonstrations and sales of ethnic handcrafts and culinary arts. In recent years, Heritage Hall Museum and Archives, located adjacent to the Freeman Academy campus, offers historical presentations during Schmeckfest.

The Schmeckfest meal was served buffet style in the early years before switching to family style in 1965. In 2018, buffet-style serving returned for the 60th Schmeckfest, which is part of an emphasis on the historic nature of the 2018 observance and continues as the dining format.

A book on the 60-year history of Schmeckfest was published in 2018. "Schmeckfest at 60" is a 252-page hardcover book that includes a comprehensive look at the festival and more the 150 photos and illustrations. It was published by Second Century Publishing Inc., of Freeman which also publishes the Freeman Courier. Copies are available for sale at the Courier office in downtown Freeman.

Beginning 
South Dakota Mennonite College was founded in 1900, and three years later, classes began in "The College" building (today's "Music Hall"), located one-quarter mile south of the downtown area of Freeman, S.D. Today, Freeman Academy is a private Christian school for grades 1-12.

The first Schmeckfest was Friday, March 13, 1959. The German "tasting festival" was served buffet style in the basement of Pioneer Hall in Freeman, SD. All guests were encouraged to "take all you want, but eat all you take". The cost of meal tickets was one dollar for adults and fifty cents for grade school children. Preschool-aged kids ate free. Serving began at 5:00 p.m. followed at 7:00 by a "period of relaxation with recorded German music" and a talent program. The popularity of that first festival exceeded expectations; many people were disappointed to learn the food was gone by the time they arrived. But the organizers, the Freeman Junior College Women's Auxiliary, saw the interest in the event and the potential it offered. The second Schmeckfest was held in 1960 and the festival became an annual event.

Since then Schmeckfest has expanded to two days, then to three days and now to four days — two days for two consecutive weekends in March or April.

References

External links 
 Schmeckfest Web site 
 Schmeckfest: Food Traditions of the Germans from Russia, on The Libraries North Dakota State University
 Senate (of S.D.) Commemoration 5, of Schmeckfest
 http://www.americasheartland.org/episodes/episode_102/schmeckfest.htm

Food and drink festivals in the United States
German-Russian culture in South Dakota
Tourist attractions in Hutchinson County, South Dakota
Mennonitism in South Dakota
Festivals in South Dakota
Spring festivals
Festivals established in 1959
1959 establishments in South Dakota
Russian Mennonite diaspora in the United States